The 2009 season is Sydney FC's second season of football (soccer) in Australia's women's league, the W-League.

Season 2 - 2009

Fixtures

Standings

Players

Player Movement
Player movement retrieved from recent articles.

In

 Teigan Allen
 Julie Rydahl (Linköpings FC)
 Cathrine Paaske (Linköpings FC)
 Michelle Carney
 Catherine Cannuli
 Kyah Simon (Central Coast Mariners)
 Brittany Whitfield
 Karla Monforte

Out
 Jo Burgess (Brisbane Roar)
 Rachel Cooper (Central Coast Mariners)
 Jessica Seaman (Central Coast Mariners)
 Samantha Spackman (Central Coast Mariners)
 Kelly Golebiowski (Central Coast Mariners)
 Michelle Heyman (Central Coast Mariners)
 Carlie Ikonumou (Newcastle Jets)
 Loren Mahoney (Newcastle Jets)
 Maggie Elhusseini
 Jordan Marsh
 Leah Blayney

Leading scorers

The leading goal scorers from the regular season.

Squad statistics
Last updated 10 October 2009

Records
First game = 3-1 loss home V Central Coast Mariners
Largest win = 
Largest loss = 3-1 home V Central Coast Mariners

References

2009
Sydney Fc